A-Teens (stylized as A★TEENS or A*Teens) were a Swedish pop music group from Stockholm, Sweden, formed by Niklas Berg in 1998 originally as an ABBA tribute band called ABBA-Teens and was later renamed A-Teens. The band members were Marie Serneholt, Amit Paul, Dhani Lennevald and Sara Lumholdt. The band's debut album became a success around the world. In 2001, following their second album, Teen Spirit, it was reported that the band had sold 2 million copies.

After six years together, the band announced in April 2004 they would take a break in after the release of their Greatest Hits album in May the same year. Each song from that album became a Top 20 hit in at least one country around the world. However, following in  the year 2006, Serneholt's Swedish-language website has announced that they had made their break-up more indefinite, and is said to have finally disbanded as they all went to pursue solo recording careers for the next few years.

History

1998–2001: The ABBA Generation

In 1998, Marie, Sara, Dhani, and Amit were musically united as the ABBA-Teens. However, the group's name was changed to the A-Teens to avoid litigation.  This choice allowed the band more freedom in creating their own style of music.

In early 1999, the band started the recording process of what would be their debut album, The ABBA Generation, consisting purely of ABBA covers reinterpreted with a modern pop and electronic flair to appeal to a new generation of young pop fans. Their first single, "Mamma Mia", topped the charts in over ten countries including their home country Sweden where it stayed at number one for eight consecutive weeks. The album hit the peak position in Sweden & Argentina and became a top ten hit throughout the world. Further singles enjoyed similar success ensuring top ten placings across the globe, and the album overall sold more than 2 million copies worldwide,(Citation needed) being certified Gold or Platinum in over 22 countries.

The band's music video for "Dancing Queen" was playfully based on the 1985 John Hughes film The Breakfast Club. In addition, the principal seen in the music video was played by Paul Gleason, the same actor who was the principal in the film. The single reached ninety-five on the Billboard Hot 100 and sold over 500,000 copies in the U.S. alone, being certified Gold.

In early 2000, the band embarked on a U.S. promotional tour, and on the verge of the release of their album in the United States, the band was invited to tour with Britney Spears that summer in her U.S. Tour. They also made several appearances on Disney and Nickelodeon to promote their music. The band's debut became a hit in North America, where the album reached seventy-one on the Billboard 200 Albums Chart being certified Gold in September 2000, but its sales reached the million mark in 2001.

That month, the A-Teens won a Viva Music Award for Best International Newcomer, competing with the likes of Christina Aguilera and Blink-182, and also the band announced what would be the lead single from their second album and their first to be an original song, "Upside Down", which would also become their signature song. The song was released to Swedish radios on 23 October 2000, and was later unleashed worldwide. When the single was commercially released, it reached number two in Sweden and was later certified 2× Platinum. The song became the band's biggest hit when it reached the top ten in several countries and when the single was released in the United States. The physical single reached number six on the Billboard Hot 100 Single Sales Chart, selling over 500,000 copies in three weeks and being certified Gold. In January 2001, the band was nominated for "Best Swedish Group" at the NRJ Awards.

2001–2002: Teen Spirit 

The band's second album, entitled "Teen Spirit", featured a compilation of tracks that were not ABBA covers and when it was finally released on 26 February 2001, it debuted at number two in the Swedish Charts. This pop sensation hit reached the top ten in other countries and entered at number eighty-three on the World Charts, number thirteen on the European Albums Chart, number fourteen on CNN's WorldBeat Album Charts and peaked at number fifty in the United States selling over 60,000 copies in its first two weeks, ensuring Gold Status for sales exceeding the 500,000 copies in the United States alone. Prior to the release of the album, the A-Teens became one of the first bands to broadcast one of their shows on MSN's Websites.

The UK releases were delayed due to A-Teens' failure with their previous album in that country. When "Upside Down" was released there in May 2001, it became their biggest hit in the country. The single peaked at number ten in the United Kingdom becoming their only top ten hit in that country. The album was delayed and released after the second single, "Halfway Around The World" in late October 2001. The single barely made the top thirty and the album did not chart in the top 75.

Before they started their concert tour in the U.S. the band went to promote their album to Asia, with stops in Japan, Singapore, Malaysia where they did show for MTV Asia and Thailand, with great success, especially in the former where Coca-Cola signed the band to become the face of the brand there and promote, "We were the first international artists ever to appear on a soda can there. They printed 15 million of them; we went home with ten!" Remembers Sara, The cans were distributed around the country that year. Also in 2001, the A-Teens performed as top billing during the Radio Disney Live! 2001 World Tour in Chicago and Philadelphia markets.

The group promoted their album with a forty-three-date tour with Aaron Carter around the U.S. Back in Europe, the band toured with No Angels in Germany. By the end of 2001, Teen Spirit went on to sell over 1 million copies worldwide and were invited by Walt Disney/Buena Vista to record the European soundtrack for the movie "The Princess Diaries". As the movie had already been released in North and South America, the movie was set to be released in Europe in the winter 2001. "Heartbreak Lullaby" a song written by Cathy Dennis (famous for writing Kylie Minogue's number one hit, "Can't Get You Out of My Head") and Kasmanaut, the video was shot in Germany in late October, in the middle of their tour. The single was released in December 2001 and it became another top ten hit for the band in their home country spending four months inside the charts.

2002–2003: Pop 'til You Drop! 
In early 2002, the band started working on what would be their third studio album. In January a press conference was held in Stockholm with American rock musician Alice Cooper, they announced they would do a collaboration recording Cooper's classic, "School's Out". The song was recorded on 25 January in Stockholm, Sweden. Two versions were recorded, a Pop Version and a Harder Version and both were planned to be included on A-Teens' third album due to be released mid-2002.

During the start of the year, many updates and reports were published on the band's official website anticipating the release of the album. By March 2002, the band reported they had over fifteen tracks already recorded, giving names of tracks and telling the fans the direction they were going musically. The band finished recording their album in late March that year with meeting with MCA executives to plan what would be the promotion and tour for the album.

In May 2002, the band announced the first single to be taken from the album would be Elvis Presley's and UB40's cover "Can't Help Falling In Love" to be launched to radios that month, F4's was released in 18 December soundtrack from the asian album, Fantasy 4ever and would also serve as the soundtrack of the then new Disney movie Lilo & Stitch. A series of promotional stops in different TV Shows throughout the United States followed to promote both the movie and the album.

On 18 June their third studio album, Pop 'til You Drop!, was released exclusively in the United States. The album was aimed to the American market putting on hold the release for the international markets. The album debuted at number forty-five on the Billboard 200 Albums Chart. The single also received a commercial release in Australia and Sweden in September 2002.

The band announced their first headlining tour in the United States. The Pop 'til You Drop! Tour, a thirty-date tour around the U.S., was held in the summer of 2002 with Baha Men, Jump5, LMNT and Play. The tour ran from mid-July until the end of August throughout the United States and Canada. The concert tour consisted mainly of outdoor venues at amusement parks and amphitheaters. The tour consisted of songs from all three of their studio albums.

Later in 2002, due to public demand, the album was released in several Latin American countries, including Argentina and Mexico, the latter a country where the band promoted in November. The band had a concert planned in the Auditorio Nacional but was later canceled due to some problems with the set. The band was also invited to do a show for the King and Queen of Sweden and the then president of Mexico, Vicente Fox. Their album reached number three on the international albums chart and number fourteen on the main album charts. After the promotion in Mexico, the band headed to Europe to release their single "Floorfiller". The song became a top five hit in their home country and reached the top forty in most European countries as well as becoming a hit in Latin America, but did not match the success of their previous releases.

The band appeared on CNN's The Music Room in December 2002, talking about pop music in Sweden.

2003–2004: New Arrival 
By the end of 2002 the A-Teens were in Europe, on the verge of what would be the international release of their third album, the band performed their hit single, "Floorfiller" at the 2002 Swedish Hit Music Awards as part of the promotion for their new album.

In January 2003 the band announced the release dates of their third album for the international market The band promoted in Germany and the Netherlands prior to the album's release. On 27 January the album, entitled New Arrival (a reference to the ABBA album entitled Arrival), was released. It combined tracks from the last effort Pop 'til You Drop! and new tracks, making a whole new album, or a "half-new album", as they described it. Some of the material on these two albums was co-written by the members of the A-Teens. The majority of tracks, while recorded in Sweden, were the work of producers from the United States, Norway, Denmark and Sweden. The album debuted at number four in Sweden and was certified Gold a few weeks after its release. The second single taken from the album (first in some countries), was "A Perfect Match", the band shot the video for the song in Cuba, the video was premiered on 26 February on ZTV. When the single was released, it reached number two in Sweden and ensured top forty placings all over the world. Worldwide releases of the album followed, including a release in Mexico, on 24 March, the band promoted in the country for almost a month, their album reached number seven on the international album charts and number fifteen on the main album charts in late April that year.

Back in their homeland, the band embarked in their New Arrival Tour across Europe doing shows all over Sweden, Denmark, Russia and Slovakia.

The band signed a promotional deal to promote Popdrinks in Sweden, with the song "Bounce With Me", Amit graduated from high school and Marie Serneholt was named the third-sexiest woman in Sweden.

The third single from the album (second in some countries), "Let Your Heart Do All the Talking" was meant to be commercially released, but after the lack of sales of the A-Teens album in a worldwide scale, the record label canceled the release, and just unleashed the song to radios. Sales for "New Arrival" were lower than expected, selling fewer than 350,000 copies worldwide. The band still got a nomination in the Swedish Hit Music Awards for "Swedish artist/group of the year".

The album also contains a cover from Murray Head's "One Night in Bangkok" (from the musical Chess). The music of this song is written by Benny Andersson and Björn Ulvaeus (the two male ABBA members), while the lyrics are written by Tim Rice. Other covers featured on the album include Shirley & Company's "Shame, Shame, Shame" and The Box Tops' "The Letter".

2004–2006: Greatest Hits and break-up 
By the beginning of 2004 the band announced their first Greatest Hits compilation was going to be released, a cover of Nick Kamen's "I Promised Myself" became the last single from the band.

The band shot the video for the song in March 2004, and was premiered on ZTV in early April, the song went to international radios on late April/May becoming the last hit of the band. The album was a compilation of thirteen singles, which each one of them made the top twenty in at least one country and three new tracks, two of them were written by the band members.

Promotion for the album was slow, the band did a few shows in Sweden and international interviews to magazines. Many were reporting the band was splitting up after six years in the pop world. The band quickly denied the rumours on their official website.

The single became another top-two hit for the band in Sweden, it became one of the band's biggest hits in South America (especially in Argentina) and the album became the band's first to not make the top ten in their homeland while it brought back the attention to them in other countries in Latin America and Eastern Europe.

The album was just released in selected European countries, Asia and only Mexico and Argentina in Latin America. It did not receive a U.S. release, although, when MCA Records went bankrupt and was absorbed by both Geffen and Interscope, the former had plans to release it in November, ready for the Christmas sales, but plans were scrapped when the band finished their tour and Dhani released his first solo single.

After "Greatest Hits" was released, the band announced a two-year break. On 15 April 2006, Serneholt's Swedish website officially announced that the A-Teens had disbanded. The members of the group wanted to pursue solo careers. In one magazine Serneholt stated, "The A-Teens are nothing but a memory now, we have all started our own projects." Lennevald confirmed his former groupmate's comment.

2006–present: Solo careers and possible Melodifestivalen entry 
All four pursued solo recording careers over the next few years, before moving into other aspects of music and entertainment, or careers unrelated to music.

In September 2004 Dhani Lennevald released "Girl Talk", his first single as a solo artist, in Sweden. There it peaked at number twenty-nine, ensuring Gold status after nine weeks on the charts. After parting ways with Universal Music in 2005, Lennevald works as a music producer and songwriter and has co-operated with artists such as Avicii, Måns Zelmerlöw and Sandro Cavazza.

In 2005, Marie Serneholt signed with SonyBMG and in early 2006, she released her first single as a solo artist titled "That's the Way My Heart Goes". It reached number two in Sweden in February, and was later released in Europe and certified Gold. This was followed by the album Enjoy the Ride which peaked at number nine in her homeland. 

In late 2008 A-Teens was involved in intense meetings planning a possible comeback for Melodifestivalen 2009. According to Sara Lumholdt all former members were on board a reformation but negotiations ultimately fell through due to an inability to work out a schedule which didn't violate individual members' previous commitments. Instead Serneholt participated in Melodifestivalen 2009 as a solo act with the track "Disconnect Me", finishing 6th in Heat 1. In 2011 she was the host for Melodifestivalen in Sweden. She also participated in Melodifestivalen 2012 with the single "Salt and Pepper", again finishing 6th at the Heat stage. Serneholt was a judge on X Factor in Sweden where she was the mentor for the groups. Serneholt has moved into working as a model and as a TV-host for shows like Bingolotto and other game shows.

Amit Sebastian Paul made his debut as well. Songs in a Key of Mine is a mini-album with eight demos. Amit Paul has released his first Solo album "Songs In A Key Of Mine" which features 12 songs in April 2008, with the first single "Judge You" was released soon after. Amit Paul then finished his master's degree at the Stockholm School of Economics, where he did an internship at the management consultancy Bain & Company. In 2010 Amit joined his family business, Paxymer AB, as a managing director.

In 2005 Sara Lumholdt began working with producers from the United States and Europe to release more music according to her official MySpace page. After unsuccessful negotiations with Swedish record labels Sara Lumholdt went to LA in pursuit of a US solo career. Sara released a cover of Olivia Newton-John's song "Physical" for a compilation album under the name of Sara Love. She released "Glamour Bitch" to her MySpace page, what was said to be her debut single, and another single, "First", became available on iTunes in July 2008. Sara recorded songs for a full album and was offered a contract with a US label but due to her unfavorable contract terms she was strongly advised by her lawyers not to sign and Sara returned to Sweden. In the wake of negotiations for an A-Teens reunion breaking down Sara recorded new material and eventually sent in a song for participation in Melodifestivalen 2011. Singing the song "Enemy", she finished 7th in the third semi-final on 19 February. She moved on to working as a pole dancing instructor and is one of the founders of FLOW, a pole dance studio based in Sweden. In 2014, Sara won Swedish Championships in pole dance.

Discography 

For a complete list of all the songs, see List of songs recorded by A-Teens

 The ABBA Generation (1999)
 Teen Spirit (2001)
 Pop 'til You Drop! (2002)
 New Arrival (2003)

Tours 
 Pop 'Til You Drop! (2002)

References

External links 
 

 
Musical groups established in 1998
Musical groups disestablished in 2004
Musical quartets
Child musical groups
Swedish child singers
Swedish co-ed groups
Swedish Eurodance groups
Swedish pop music groups
Teen pop groups
ABBA tribute bands
1998 establishments in Sweden
Musical groups from Stockholm
English-language singers from Sweden
MCA Records artists
Universal Music Group artists